Platte County High School, located in Platte City, Missouri, is the only high school in the  Platte County R-3 School District. It serves students in Platte County.

Campus 

The building itself has been expanded several times from its original configuration, with additional wings built over the years, including an auditorium and choir/band room. In the summer of 2005, a new middle school was built, and the district's original middle school, which was attached to the high school via a single narrow hallway, was incorporated into the high school. A new main entrance, library, and atrium were built in what was formerly an open courtyard between the high school and middle school. Also in the summer of 2009, there was a new choir room acoustically built for the choir members.

The building has three offices: a technology department, an attendance office, and a central office. The campus itself also has two basketball courts, a football field (with Fieldturf, and press box), a theater, two acoustic rooms for choir and band practice, A softball field, a baseball field, and a multi-purpose room mostly used for wrestling. In the fall of 2009 the north annex, the old central office, was added to the campus located to the north of the main high school building. In the fall of 2016 the south annex, formerly Paxton elementary school was added to the campus.

Athletics 
Fall sports include Girls softball, Girls Golf, Girls Tennis, Girls and Boys Cross Country, Boys Soccer, Girls Volleyball, Boys Swimming and Diving and Football. Winter sports include Boys and Girls Basketball, Girls Swimming and Diving, and Wrestling. Spring sports include Girls Soccer, Boys Tennis, Boys Golf, and Girls and Boys Track and Field. Cheerleading runs from fall to mid February. The Platte County High School football team at one point amassed 52 uninterrupted wins in the 2000 (14–0), 2001 (14–0), 2002 (14–0), and 2003 (10–1) seasons. The baseball team won Missouri state championships in 2002 and 2022.

Controversies 
In December 2019, a noose, made out of white shoestrings, was found hanging in a boys bathroom. It followed an incident in 2018 where nooses made out of paper were discovered stuck to the walls of the high school.

References

External links 

High schools in Platte County, Missouri
Public high schools in Missouri